The 2001 William Jones Cup (24th tournament) took place in Taiwan. Chinese Taipei won its first title since the first edition of the tournament 24 years ago.

Standings

Results

Awards

References

2001
2001 in Taiwanese sport
2001–02 in Asian basketball
2001–02 in North American basketball
2001–02 in Russian basketball
2001 in African basketball
August 2001 sports events in Asia